Twelve Women is a 1939 Argentine comedy film directed by Luis Moglia Barth and starring Roberto Escalada.

Cast
 Olinda Bozán
 Paquito Busto
 Delia Garcés
 Nuri Montsé
 Roberto Escalada
 Aída Alberti
 Cecile Lezard
 Mecha López
 César Fiaschi
 Alberto Bello
 Fanny Navarro
 Tilde Pieroni
 Noemí Escalada
 Dora Pastor

References

External links

1939 films
1930s Spanish-language films
Argentine black-and-white films
Films directed by Luis Moglia Barth
1930s Argentine films